Narciso Perales (3 September 1914 – 18 June 1993) was a Spanish Falangist who went from being decorated by order of José Antonio Primo de Rivera to be confined and victimized under the Francoist Spain because of ideological differences.

See also
Politics of Spain

References

1914 births
1993 deaths
Spanish Falangists